The 24th World Acrobatic Gymnastics Championships were held in Levallois-Perret, France at the Palais des Sports Marcel-Cerdan. The women's groups qualifications were held on 10, 11 and 12 July 2014.

2014 Acrobatic Gymnastics World Championships
2014 in women's gymnastics